Meadow Woods is a census-designated place and an unincorporated suburban development area located in southern Orange County, Florida, United States, between Orlando International Airport and Kissimmee. The population was 25,558 at the 2010 census, up from 11,286 in 2000. It is part of the Orlando–Kissimmee–Sanford, Florida Metropolitan Statistical Area.

Geography
Meadow Woods is located at  (28.374852, -81.363858), in the southern portion of Orange County outside of the Orlando city limits. Its southern side is adjacent to Buenaventura Lakes in Osceola County, to the west is located Southchase (Orange County), to the north are the unincorporated community of Taft and the Boggy Creek neighborhood of Orlando city proper, and to the east are Orlando International Airport and Lake Nona.

According to the United States Census Bureau, the CDP has a total area of 29.6 km2 (11.4 mi2), of which 29.4 km2 (11.4 mi2) is land and 0.1 km2 (0.04 mi2) (0.35%) is water.

Demographics

As of the census of 2000, there were 11,286 people, 3,472 households, and 2,850 families residing in the CDP.  The population density was 383.2/km2 (992.3/mi2).  There were 4,441 housing units at an average density of 150.8/km2 (390.5/mi2).  The racial makeup of the CDP was 66.99% White, 11.95% African American, 0.55% Native American, 2.42% Asian, 0.12% Pacific Islander, 13.32% from other races, and 4.65% from two or more races. Hispanic or Latino of any race were 52.84% of the population.

There were 3,472 households, out of which 44.8% had children under the age of 18 living with them, 60.9% were married couples living together, 15.7% had a female householder with no husband present, and 17.9% were non-families. 11.3% of all households were made up of individuals, and 2.9% had someone living alone who was 65 years of age or older.  The average household size was 3.25 and the average family size was 3.52.

In the CDP, the population was spread out, with 29.8% under the age of 18, 9.3% from 18 to 24, 32.1% from 25 to 44, 20.7% from 45 to 64, and 8.0% who were 65 years of age or older.  The median age was 33 years. For every 100 females, there were 94.1 males.  For every 100 females age 18 and over, there were 89.1 males.

The median income for a household in the CDP was $46,033, and the median income for a family was $48,076. Males had a median income of $30,081 versus $21,960 for females. The per capita income for the CDP was $15,805.  About 5.9% of families and 7.5% of the population were below the poverty line, including 8.9% of those under age 18 and 10.0% of those age 65 or over.

Transportation

The major roads of the small community of Meadow Woods are Landstar Boulevard, Town Center Boulevard/Rhode Island Woods Circle/Wyndham Lakes Boulevard, and Weatherbee Road.

The Central Florida Greeneway (SR 417) serves Meadow Woods, which has an access at the intersection with Landstar Boulevard at Exit 14.

Orlando International Airport borders Meadow Woods to the north and east.

SunRail commuter rail service opened a Meadow Woods station at the northwest corner of the community in June of 2018. The rail line also handles Amtrak's Silver Service lines as well as several CSX freight trains.

Meadow Woods is served by Lynx bus routes 18 (on Landstar Boulevard) and FastLink 418 (on Rhode Island Woods Circle). In June 2013, Orange County Commissioner Jennifer Thompson asked for $300,000 funding for the latter route, which provides a connection to the Sand Lake Road SunRail station, which currently serves as the rail line's interim southern terminus. With installation of the new Sunrail train station, the bus routes has been adjusted a little bit.

Points of interest
 Meadow Woods Recreation Center with a community gym and offices is located within a park area
 Several elementary and middle grade schools
 Warehouses for Whirlpool Corporation, Sealy Mattresses, Siemens
 South Orange Youth Sports Complex includes several baseball fields
 Newly expanded shopping plaza at Town Center and Landstar includes main markets like Publix, Walmart, pharmacies convenience stores CVS and Walgreens
  New fast food places like Arby’s, Chipotle Mexican Grill, Marcos Pizza, Panda Express

References

External links
 www.city-data.com

Census-designated places in Orange County, Florida
Greater Orlando
Census-designated places in Florida
Planned communities in Florida